Nagla Buddh Singh is a village in Shikohabad tehsil, Firozabad district, Uttar Pradesh. This is a small village and belongs to dandiamai gramsabha.

Location

The nearest major city is Agra which is about 60 km from the village.  The nearest railway station is Shikohabad Jn. which is about 2 km from the village.  The nearest bus stop is Shikohabad bus stop which is 5 km from the city.

The PIN Code for the village is 205141(283141) 
It is 240 km away from national capital.

Climate

The weather is typically like Agra. It is always sunny here in summer, days and nights both are almost same in terms of temperature. May–June are the peak months, temperature in these months are about 36-46'C. Rainy season is quite OK temperature most of the times fluctuate between 24-36'C. Winter is the season when you should visit this place. It is as cold as you can hold, you can see people enjoying bone-fire in Dec-Jan because the temperature is 12-24'C in day time. Overall weather is pleasant in winter.

Population

Population of the village is about 200-220.

History

The village was founded by Thakur Buddh Singh and because of that it is named on his name.

Transport

Shikohabad is the city which connects the village with other major cities.

Literacy & Employment

Villagers are educated some of them are post graduated (currently living) and literacy rate is quite better in comparison to other villages. There is one primary school as well. The major source of earning is farming (Kheti). Potato farm is the key source of earning and there are other crops too like  Corn, Millet (Bajara), Wheat, Watermelon, Muskmelon, Pulse( Urad), Kidney bean (moong), Mustard, Rice.

Fairs and festivals

Villagers celebrate all major Hindu festivals with great joy. Still Diwali, Holi, Raksha-Bandhan are the major festivals. There is a fair on Mahaveer (Hanumaan) Jayanti.

Rivers

Yamuna is the nearest major river.

Villages in Firozabad district